Yoram Bilu is an Israeli professor of anthropology and psychology emeritus at the Hebrew University of Jerusalem.

He is known for his work on  folk religion (messianism, saint worship);  the interaction between culture and mental health; the sanctification of space in Israel; and the religious and cultural practices of Moroccan Jews. He is  recipient of 2013 the Israel Prize in sociology and anthropology.  He is a member of the Israel Academy of Sciences and Humanities.

From 2003 to 2004 he held a fellowship at the Katz Center for Advanced Judaic Studies. He has also been a member of the Israeli Society and of the American Association of Anthropology and serves as a member of the following scientific journals: Transcultural Psychiatry, Anthropology and Medicine, Contemporary Jewry.

References

Israeli anthropologists
Year of birth missing (living people)
Living people
Jewish anthropologists